Syedna Ibrahim Wajihuddin Bin Syedi AbdulQadir Hakimuddin (died on 17 Moharram 1168 AH/1756 AD, Ujjain, India) was the 39th Dā'ī of the Dawoodi Bohras. He succeeded the 38th Dā'ī Syedna Ismail Badruddin II to the religious post.

Life 
Syedna Ibrahim was born in 1690. He procured his initial education from his father, Syedi AbdulQadir Hakimuddin. At the young age of twenty-one, Syedna Vajihuddin was sent by his father for the Khidmat (service) of the Dai. He served Syedna Musa Kalimuddin and Syedna Noor Mohammed Nooruddin in the most adverse of times. 

In 1143H, Ujjain was affected by a severe drought. Followers of different religions prayed for rain but in vain. Syedna Vajihuddin along with the Mumineen (faithful) proceeded to the banks of river Sipra and prayed to Allah for rain. On conclusion of his prayers, the people of Ujjain were indeed relieved as it soon started raining heavily.

Syedna Ibrahim Wajihuddin became Da'i al-Mutlaq in 1150AH/1738AD. His period of Dawat was from 1150-1168 AH/1738-1756 AD.

He was succeeded by his son, the 40th Dai Syedna Hebatullah-il-Muʾayyad Fiddeen after he died at the age of 58.

His associates/deputies were: 

 Mawazeen: Sheikh Adam bin Syedna Nooruddin, Syedna Hebatullah-il-Muʾayyad Fiddeen 
 Mukasir: Ali bin Phirji

The Hebtiahs Bohra are a branch of Mustaali Ismaili Shi'a Islam that broke off from the mainstream Dawoodi Bohra after the death of Syedna Ibrahim Wajihuddin in 1754. See Hebtiahs Bohra.

Mazar-e Najmi 
Syedna Ibrahim Wajihuddin along with two other Du'āt; Syedna Hebatullah-il-Muʾayyad Fiddeen and Syedna AbdulQadir Najmuddin are buried in this Mausoleum located at Qamari Marg, Ujjain, India.

References

Further reading
 
 
 

Dawoodi Bohra da'is
1690 births
1756 deaths